St Austell Brewery is a brewery founded in 1851 by Walter Hicks in St Austell, Cornwall, England.

History 
Originally named Walter Hicks & Co: brewers and wine merchants, the brewery company was renamed St Austell Brewery and significantly expanded by Hicks' daughter Hester Parnall (1868-1939), who became a Director in 1911. She took over running the company on her father's death in 1916, and added nearly 80 pubs and hotels to the brewery's holdings, becoming known for "ruling the company with the grace of a duchess combined with the aplomb of a successful businessman".

The brewery's flagship beer is Tribute Ale, which accounts for around 80% of sales. Other popular ales include Proper Job, Tinner's Ale and Duchy Bitter.

On 1 July 2016 St Austell Brewery acquired Bath Ales. In March 2017 a multi-million pound investment in a new brewery and larger bottling and canning facilities at Bath Ales was announced. Chief executive, James Staughton, described the rationale of the investment as "We needed to de-risk the business away from the seasonality of Cornwall. The further east we go, the more we're focused on city centres and the less seasonal the business becomes."

Beers
Tribute was created to commemorate the 1999 solar eclipse. It was originally a one-off special named Daylight Robbery, but proved to be so popular it was reintroduced as Tribute and has since won several awards around the UK.

St Austell Brewery signed a deal in 2008 with Healeys Cornish Cyder Farm, near Truro, to continue kegging and distributing Rattler cyder and Rattler pear cyder for five years.

St Austell Brewery also produce M&S Cornish IPA, which is bottle-conditioned and sold in Marks and Spencer stores.

Other products include:
 Proper Job IPA (4.5% cask, 5.5% bottled) - also sold as M&S Cornish IPA at a strength of 5%
 Black Prince (4%)
 Trelawny (3.8%)
 HSD (Hicks Special Draught) (5.0%)
 Dartmoor Best Bitter (3.5%)
 Korev Cornish Lager (4.8%)
 Big Job IPA (7.2%)
 Mena Dhu (Cornish Stout) (4.5%)

References

External links

 St Austell Brewery website
 Tribute Website

Companies based in Cornwall
St Austell
Food and drink companies established in 1851
1851 establishments in England
Cornish cuisine
Breweries in England
British companies established in 1851